The Virgin Wife is a 1926 American silent drama film directed by Elmer Clifton and starring Pauline Garon, Niles Welch and Kenneth Harlan.

Cast
 Pauline Garon as Mary Jordan
 Niles Welch as Thomas Lattimer
 Kenneth Harlan as Dr. Everett Webb
 Jane Jennings as Virginia Jamieson
 Fritzi Brunette as Mrs. Henry Lattimer
 Joseph Allen Sr. as Henry Lattimer 
 Charles Byer  		
 Orville Caldwell 
 Ricca Allen	
 Marie Schaefer	
 William Walcott

References

Bibliography
 Munden, Kenneth White. The American Film Institute Catalog of Motion Pictures Produced in the United States, Part 1. University of California Press, 1997.

External links
 

1926 films
1926 drama films
American silent feature films
Silent American drama films
American black-and-white films
Films directed by Elmer Clifton
1920s American films
1920s English-language films